Graderia fruticosa is a species of plant in the family Orobanchaceae. It is endemic to Yemen. Its natural habitats are subtropical or tropical dry shrubland and rocky areas.

References

Orobanchaceae
Endemic flora of Socotra
Vulnerable plants
Taxonomy articles created by Polbot
Taxa named by Isaac Bayley Balfour